Cirsonella maoria is a minute sea snail, a marine gastropod mollusc in the family Skeneidae.

Description
The height of the shell attains 1.3 mm, its diameter 1.7 mm.

Distribution
This marine species is endemic to New Zealand. It occurs off Three Kings Islands at a depth of 260 m.

References

 Powell A. W. B., New Zealand Mollusca, William Collins Publishers Ltd, Auckland, New Zealand 1979 

maoria
Gastropods of New Zealand
Gastropods described in 1937